Ajit Singh Varman (26 March 1947 – 15 December 2016), sometimes also credited as Ajit Verman, was an Indian film music composer. He started his career in the 1960s as a musician for the likes of Satyajit Ray, Mrinal Sen, Pankaj Mullick and Salil Chowdhury in Calcutta (now Kolkata) as well as Shankar Jaikishan and Laxmikant Pyarelal in the 1970s in Mumbai (then Bombay) till 1975 when he decided to make the transition to full-time music direction.

He worked on Govind Nihalani's Aakrosh (1980), Vijeta (1982) and  Ardh Satya (1983), besides two of Mahesh Bhatt's early classics Saaransh (1984) and  Janam (1985).Yeh aashiqui meri (1998)(19

Filmography
 Aakrosh (1980) 
 Vijeta (1982) 
 Ardh Satya (1983)
 Saaransh (1984)
 Misaal (1985)
  Janam (1985, TV Movie)
 Andha Yudh (1987)
 Karm Yodha (1992)
 Imtihaan (1995, TV show)
 Mohini (1995, Background Score)

References

Bibliography

External links
 

1947 births
2016 deaths
Musicians from Kolkata
Hindi film score composers
Indian male film score composers